Diet of Worms may refer to:

Historic events
Meetings of the Imperial Diet of the Holy Roman Empire in the city of Worms, Germany
 Diet of Worms (1076)
 Diet of Worms (1122)
 Diet of Worms (1495), at which comprehensive reforms of the empire began
 Diet of Worms (1521), at which Martin Luther was outlawed as a heretic
 Other diets convened in the years 829, 926, and 1545.

Media
Diet of Worms (comedy group)

Medicine and science
A name for helminthic therapy, a medical treatment for inflammatory bowel diseases

See also 
 Worms as food

ar:اجتماع فورمس (توضيح)